Eric Roe is an American politician. A Republican, he served as a member of the Pennsylvania House of Representatives for the 158th district from 2017 to 2018.

Early life 
Roe is the son of QVC host Mary Beth Roe. He graduated from American University with a bachelor's degree in political science in 2010 and also has a master's degree in public policy from University College London. He served at the Republican National Committee in Washington from 2009 to 2011 and was a staffer for Michael Steele. Roe and his wife, Alice, both volunteer with Chester County Women's Services. He worked as an administrative assistant until 2017.

Electoral career

Pennsylvania House of Representatives

2016 election 
In April 2016, he won a write-in primary for state representative. In October, the Chairman of the Chester County Democratic Party filed voter fraud charges against Roe claiming he did not meet the residency requirements, as he leased an apartment in Washington, D.C. as recently as 2013. However, a judge dismissed the charges. In the 2016 election, he received 17,617 votes or 53.2% of the vote, defeating Susan Rzucidlo.

2018 election 
In 2018, Roe filed to run for re-election. He ran unopposed in the Republican primary and faced Democrat Christina Sappey in the general election. On November 6, Roe lost his seat to Sappey, 46% to 54%. He was one of 11 incumbents in the Delaware Valley to lose their seats.

2020 election 
On November 15, 2019, Roe announced he would seek a re-match against Sappey to regain his former seat. Both Roe and Sappey were unopposed in their respective primaries. Sappey defeated Roe by a margin of 485 votes.

References

External links
Eric Roe

Living people
Republican Party members of the Pennsylvania House of Representatives
1987 births
21st-century American politicians

American University alumni
Politicians from Chester County, Pennsylvania